Azarov (masculine) or Azarova (feminine) is a Russian surname. Variants of this surname include Azarin/Azarina (/) and Ozarovsky/Ozarovskaya (/). It is derived from the given name Azary.

People with the last name
Mykola Azarov (b. 1947), Ukrainian politician, 14th Prime Minister of Ukraine
Nadezhda Azarova (b. 1983), Belarusian chess player
Sergei Azarov (b. 1983), Belarusian chess player
Svitlana Azarova (b. 1976), Ukrainian/Dutch composer of contemporary classical music
Tatyana Azarova (b. 1985), Kazakhstani athlete
Vasili Azarov, Russian footballer
Vladimir Azarov (b. 1994), Russian association football player
Yelena Azarova (b. 1973), Russian synchronized swimmer

Fictional characters
Shurochka Azarova, cavalry maiden in the 1962 Soviet musical Hussar Ballad
Nina Azarova, character from Netflix series The OA

Toponyms
Azarova, a village in Boshinsky Rural Administrative Okrug of Karachevsky District in Bryansk Oblast, Russia;

See also
Azarovo, several rural localities in Russia

References

Notes

Sources
Ю. А. Федосюк (Yu. A. Fedosyuk). "Русские фамилии: популярный этимологический словарь" (Russian Last Names: a Popular Etymological Dictionary). Москва, 2006. 

Russian-language surnames